Jukka Mönkkönen (born 16 August 1959 in Kuopio, Finland) is a Finnish Professor of Biopharmacy who was appointed as the Rector of the University of Eastern Finland for a five-year term of office that began on 1 January 2015. Before his appointment as the Rector of the University of Eastern Finland, Jukka Mönkkönen served as the Academic Rector of the University of Eastern Finland in 2012–2014.

Jukka Mönkkönen obtained his master's degree in pharmacy from the University of Kuopio in 1986, and his doctoral degree in pharmacy in 1991. He has held several research and teaching positions and, since 1998, he has been Professor of Biopharmacy. Mönkkönen has served as the Dean of the Faculty of Pharmacy of the University of Kuopio, as the Dean of the Faculty of Health Sciences of the University of Eastern Finland, and as the Academic Rector of the University of Eastern Finland.

His scientific research has focused on the molecular pharmacology of drugs affecting bone metabolism, and on the mechanisms of drug absorption.

References

External links
Jukka Mönkkönen's CV
Jukka Mönkkönen’s research articles and expert positions

1959 births
Living people
Academic staff of the University of Eastern Finland